Morton W. MacAuley, usually known as M. W. MacAuley was a politician in Alberta, Canada and a municipal councillor in Edmonton.

Biography

MacAuley was born in Inverness County, Nova Scotia on Cape Breton.  He studied medicine at Dalhousie University, and worked as a surgeon in Halifax and practiced medicine in Pictou County for ten years before coming to Edmonton.  He ran in the 1906 Edmonton election, and was elected to a one-year term as alderman on Edmonton City Council by finishing fifth of twelve candidates.  He resigned eight months into his term, on August 6, 1907, and did not re-enter politics thereafter.

References
City of Edmonton biography of Morton MacAuley

Year of birth missing
Year of death missing
People from Inverness County, Nova Scotia
Canadian surgeons
Edmonton city councillors
Canadian people of Scottish descent
Dalhousie University alumni